Davor Glavina (born 10 December 1970) is a Slovenian sailor. He competed in the men's 470 event at the 2004 Summer Olympics.

References

External links
 

1970 births
Living people
Slovenian male sailors (sport)
Olympic sailors of Slovenia
Sailors at the 2004 Summer Olympics – 470
Sportspeople from Koper